Termitidae is the largest family of termites consisting of 2,105 described species of which are commonly known as the higher termites. They are evolutionarily the most specialised termite group, with their highly compartmentalized hindgut lacking the flagellated protozoans common to "lower termites", which are instead replaced by bacteria. Whereas lower termites are restricted mostly to woody tissue, higher termites have diverse diets consisting of wood, grass, leaf litter, fungi, lichen, faeces, humus and soil. Around 60% of species rely on soil-feeding alone.

Subfamilies
The family contains the following subfamilies:

Termitidae Latreille, 1802
Subfamily Apicotermitinae Grassé & Noirot, 1954 [1955] (synonym: Indotermitidae Roonwal & Sen Sarma in Roonwal, 1958)
Subfamily Cubitermitinae Weidner, 1956
Subfamily Foraminitermitinae Holmgren, 1912 (synonym: Pseudomicrotermitinae Holmgren, 1912)
Subfamily Macrotermitinae Kemner, 1934, nomen protectum [ICZN 2003] (synonyms: Acanthotermitinae Sjöstedt, 1926, nomen rejiciendum [ICZN 2003]; Odontotermitini Weidner, 1956
Subfamily Nasutitermitinae Hare, 1937
Subfamily Sphaerotermitinae Engel & Krishna, 2004a
Subfamily Syntermitinae Engel & Krishna, 2004a (synonym: Cornitermitinae Ensaf et al., 2004, nomen nudum)
Subfamily Termitinae Latreille, 1802 (synonyms: Microcerotermitinae Holmgren, 1910b; Amitermitinae Kemner, 1934 (disputed); Mirocapritermitinae Kemner, 1934; Mirotermitini Weidner, 1956; Capritermitini Weidner, 1956)

Identification

Imago forewing and hindwing scales either evenly or closely sized and not overlapping. Wing scale suture and veins are strongly sclerotized, veins reduced. Post-clypeus of workers and imagoes both swollen and protruding from head capsule. Pronotum is saddled with depressed anterior corners. Ocelli of imago typically (but not always) protruding above head capsule.

References

Termites
Blattodea families
Taxa named by Pierre André Latreille